Blackburn is a town in Lancashire, England.  It contains 72 buildings that are recorded in the National Heritage List for England as designated listed buildings.   Of these, five are listed at Grade II*, the middle grade, and the others are at Grade II, the lowest grade.  Until the coming of the Industrial Revolution, Blackburn was a market town, but then became a centre of the cotton industry.  The Leeds and Liverpool Canal came to the town in 1806, and the Blackburn and Preston Railway opened in 1846.  Following this there was a boom on the building of mills, with associated housing and the creation of civic buildings.

The listed buildings reflect the history of the town.  The earliest examples are farmhouses and farm buildings.  These are followed by houses for the wealthy and for the workers.  Later listed buildings relate to the canal, the railway, and industry; there are churches, civic buildings, a former fire station, shops, structures in the public park, and the parish church that later became a cathedral.

Key

Buildings

References

Citations

Sources

Lists of listed buildings in Lancashire
 Listed buildings